()
Hisham ud-Din, also spelled Hisam ud-Din is a male Muslim given name, composed from the elements Hisham and ad-Din. It may refer to:

Hisamuddin of Selangor (1898–1960), Sultan of Selangor and Yang di-Pertuan Agong of Malaysia
Hisam-ud-din Usta (1910–1987), Indian artist
Hishammuddin Hussein (born 1961), Malaysian politician
Che Hisamuddin Hassan (born 1972), Malaysian footballer

Arabic masculine given names